1201 Pacific, formerly the Wells Fargo Plaza, is the tallest building in Tacoma, Washington, and was completed in 1970. It was built with help from investors such as George Weyerhaeuser and Ben Cheney, and was designed by Skidmore, Owings and Merrill.

The $14 million building was announced in 1968 and uses land that was cleared under Tacoma's urban renewal program. It was originally built for the National Bank of Washington, which was acquired in 1970 by Pacific National Bank (later First Interstate Bank of Washington), in turn acquired in 1996 by Wells Fargo. It was known as the Wells Fargo Center until 2016, when it lost its naming rights.

The building, now owned by Unico Properties, was awarded LEED Silver certification in 2011.

See also
List of tallest buildings in Tacoma

References

Buildings and structures in Tacoma, Washington
Wells Fargo buildings
Skyscrapers in Washington (state)
Skyscraper office buildings in Washington (state)
Office buildings completed in 1970
Skidmore, Owings & Merrill buildings